Elections to East Dunbartonshire Council were held on 3 May 2012, the same day as the 31 other local authorities in Scotland. The election used the eight wards created under the Local Governance (Scotland) Act 2004, with 24 Councillors being elected. Each ward elected 3 members, using the STV electoral system.

The election saw Labour gain 2 seats to draw level with the Scottish National Party. However, Labour remained the largest party in terms of vote share. The Scottish National Party retained all their existing 8 seats and did not run any additional candidates though did significantly raised their vote share. The Scottish Liberal Democrats retained their 3 seats on the council. The Scottish Conservative and Unionist Party lost 3 seats, just 2 in number, the equivalent numbers of the East Dunbartonshire Independent Alliance. Former Lib Dem Cllr Duncan Cumming was elected as an Independent.

Election result

Note: "Votes" are the first preference votes. The net gain/loss and percentage changes relate to the result of the previous Scottish local elections on 3 May 2007. This may differ from other published sources showing gain/loss relative to seats held at dissolution of Scotland's councils.

Ward results

Milngavie
2007: 1xSNP; 1xCon; 1xLib Dem
2012: 1xLib Dem; 1xSNP; 1xLab
2007-2012 Change: Lab gain one seat from Con

Bearsden North
2007: 1xCon; 1xSNP; 1xLib Dem
2012: 1xIndependent; 1xLib Dem; 1xSNP
2007-2012 Change: Independent gain one seat from Con

 = Sitting Councillor from a different Ward.

Bearsden South
2007: 1xCon; 1xSNP; 1xLib Dem
2012: 1xLib Dem; 1xSNP; 1xLab
2007-2012: Lab gain one seat from Con

Campsie & Kirkintilloch North
2007: 1xEDIA; 1xLab; 1xSNP
2012: 1xEDIA; 1xLab; 1xSNP
2007-2012 Change: No change

Bishopbriggs North and Torrance
2007: 1xCon; 1xLab; 1xSNP
2012: 1xLab; 1xSNP; 1xCon
2007-2012 Change: No change

Bishopbriggs South
2007: 2xLab; 1xSNP
2012: 2xLab; 1xSNP
2007-2012 Change: No change

Lenzie & Kirkintilloch South
2007: 1xLab; 1xCon; 1xSNP
2012: 1xLab; 1xSNP; 1xCon
2007-2012 Change: No change

Kirkintilloch East & Twechar
2007: 1xLab; 1xEDIA; 1xSNP
2012: 1xLab; 1xEDIA; 1xSNP
2007-2012 Change: No change

Aftermath
Following the election, the Labour Party led a three-party coalition administration with the Liberal Democrats and the Conservatives, replacing the previous Labour/Conservative coalition that had run the council from 2007 to 2012. The leader of the council remained Labour councillor Rhondda Geekie, and Labour councillor Una Walker became provost. The depute leader and depute provost were the Lib Dem councillor Ashay Ghai and the Conservative councillor Anne Jarvis. 

Following a disagreement between the Liberal Democrats and their administration colleagues, the ruling three-party coalition reverted to a minority two-party Labour/Conservative coalition in January 2016, and the Conservatives' Billy Hendry resumed the role of depute council leader.

Post Election Changes
† Campsie and Kirkintilloch North EDIA Cllr Charles Kennedy died on 13 July 2012. The by-election was held on 14 September 2012 and was won by Labour's Gemma Welsh.

By Elections since 2012

References 

2012
2012 Scottish local elections
21st century in East Dunbartonshire